The Democratic Party leadership election was held on 4 December 2016 for the 30-member 12th Central Committee of the Democratic Party in Hong Kong, including chairperson and two vice-chairperson posts.

Incumbent chairwoman Emily Lau, former member of the Legislative Council of Hong Kong who retired in October 2016 announced her retirement from the post and was succeeded by Wu Chi-wai, member of the Legislative Council for Kowloon East, who was elected unopposed, which made it the first uncontested leadership election since 2010.

Electoral method
The Central Committee was elected by the party congress. All public office holders, including the members of the Legislative Council and District Councils, are eligible to vote in the party congress. The eligibility of members electing a delegate who holds one vote in the congress was 5 members. Candidate also needs a majority in order to claim victory.

Overview
The election came after the 2016 Legislative Council election, in which incumbent chairwoman Emily Lau and other veterans stepped down and make way for the young candidates. Lau also said she would not seek for re-election for the chair post, although there were some members petitioned to nominate Lau for another term.

Although the party had earlier passed a motion to create a party leader post in order to divide the roles between party organ and parliamentary caucus, Legislative Council member Wu Chi-wai became the only candidate for the chairmanship while another interested candidate, incumbent vice-chairman Lo Kin-hei chose to run for vice-chairmanship with incumbent secretary Li Wing-shing. Endorsing Wu, Lo said Wu was the best candidate to convince the party to implement the division of the roles.

Candidates

Chairperson
 Wu Chi-wai, Executive Committee member of the Democratic Party, Legislative Council member for Kowloon East and Wong Tai Sin District Councillor

Vice-Chairpersons
 Howard Lam Tsz-kin, Central Committee member of the Democratic Party
 Li Wing-shing, incumbent Secretary of the Democratic Party and Sha Tin District Councillor
 Lo Kin-hei, incumbent Vice-Chairman of the Democratic Party and Southern District Councillor

Elections

Results
The elected members of the 12th Central Committee are listed as following:
Chairman: Wu Chi-wai
Vice-Chairmen: Lo Kin-hei, Li Wing-shing
Treasurer: Yuen Hoi-man
Secretary: Cheung Yin-tung
Executive Committee Members:

 Chai Man-hon
 Joseph Chow Kam-siu
 Chu Shun-nga
 Joshua Fung Man-tao
 Lam Ka-ka
 Lee Wing-tat
 Mok Kin-shing
 Tsoi Yiu-cheong
 Andrew Wan Siu-kin
 Wong Kin-shing

Central Committee Members:

 Cheung Man-kwong
 Wilfred Chong Wing-fai
 Ho Chi-wai
 Ho Chun-yan
 Hui Chi-fung
 Lam Cheuk-ting
 Leung Wing-kuen
 Mark Li Kin-yin
 Bonnie Ng Hoi-yan
 Stanley Ng Wing-fai
 Ting Tsz-yuen
 Tsui Hon-kwong
 Catherine Wong Lai-sheung
 Wong Pik-wan
 Yeung Sum

References

Democratic
Democratic Party (Hong Kong)
Political party leadership elections in Hong Kong
Democratic Party (HK) leadership election